A list of books and essays written by and about François Truffaut:

Truffaut